Fossil Creek Bridge is a closed-spandrel deck arch bridge built in the U.S. state of Arizona during 1924–25  on Cottonwood-Camp Verde-Pine road across Fossil Creek.  The road, also known as Fossil Creek Road, crosses the creek at a point where it forms the border between Yavapai and Gila counties, and between the Tonto and the Prescott National Forests.  The nearest town is Strawberry in Gila County.  It is not far from Camp Verde in Yavapai County.

It has a  span, a  arch rise, Luten arch-like reinforcing and bulkheads.  It cost $10,037 to build. It was designed by the Arizona Highway Department early in 1924 and completed later that year.

References

Road bridges on the National Register of Historic Places in Arizona
Bridges completed in 1924
Buildings and structures in Gila County, Arizona
Buildings and structures in Yavapai County, Arizona
Transportation in Gila County, Arizona
Transportation in Yavapai County, Arizona
1924 establishments in Arizona
National Register of Historic Places in Gila County, Arizona
Arch bridges in the United States